Hacı Paşa or Haji Pasha was an Ottoman statesman. He was third Grand Vizier of the Ottoman Empire from 1348 to 1349. Little else is known about him other than his role as grand vizier.

See also 
 List of Ottoman Grand Viziers

References 

14th-century Grand Viziers of the Ottoman Empire
Turks from the Ottoman Empire